The Scotland Act 1978 was an Act of the Parliament of the United Kingdom intended to establish a Scottish Assembly as a devolved legislature for Scotland.  At a referendum held in the following year, the Act failed to gain the necessary level of approval required by an amendment, and was never put into effect.

Background
Following Winnie Ewing's groundbreaking win for the Scottish National Party in the 1967 Hamilton by-election, the United Kingdom government responded to the growing support for Scottish independence by setting up the Royal Commission on the Constitution, better known as the Kilbrandon Commission (1969–1973).

In response to the Royal Commission's report, James Callaghan's Labour government brought forward proposals to establish a Scottish Assembly. In November 1977 a Scotland Bill providing for the establishment of a Scottish Assembly was introduced; it received the Royal assent on 31 July 1978.

The proposed Scottish Assembly
Had the Scotland Act 1978 entered force, it would have created a Scottish Assembly with very limited legislative powers. There would have been a Scottish Executive headed by a "First Secretary", taking over some of the functions of the Secretary of State for Scotland. Two possible contenders for the post of First Secretary were The Reverend Geoff Shaw, leader of Strathclyde Regional Council, and Professor John P. Mackintosh, MP – but both died in 1978.

Assembly members would have been elected by the "first past the post" system. The Scottish Assembly would have had the power to introduce primary legislation, to be known as "Measures" (rather than Acts), within defined areas of competence.

Meetings of the Scottish Assembly would have been held at the Old Royal High School in Regent Road, Edinburgh; the former school hall was adapted for use by the Scottish Assembly, including the installation of microphones and new olive green leather seating.

Some other new offices would also have been created, such as a Comptroller and Auditor General for Scotland.

Referendum and repeal
The Scotland Act included a requirement for a "post-legislative" referendum to be held in Scotland to approve the Act's coming into force. During its passage through Parliament, an amendment introduced by George Cunningham (a Scot who represented an English seat) added a further requirement that the approval at the referendum be by 40% of Scotland's total registered electorate, rather than by a simple majority.

The referendum was held on 1 March 1979.  A total of 1,230,937 (51.6%) voted at the referendum in favour of an Assembly, a narrow majority of about 77,400 over those voting against.  However, this total represented only 32.9% of the registered electorate as a whole.  The Labour government accepted that the Act's requirements had not been met, and that devolution would therefore not be introduced for Scotland.

Under the terms of the Act, it was then repealed by a Statutory instrument to be approved by Parliament.  The Scottish National Party subsequently voted against the government in a vote of no confidence which led to the resignation of the Callaghan government, and an election was called. The vote to approve the statutory instrument repealing the Act was not held until 20 June 1979, by which time a Conservative government had come to power under Margaret Thatcher. The Order-in-Council was subsequently made on 26 July 1979.

Postscript

In 1998 a new Scotland Act was passed, leading to the establishment of the Scottish Parliament.   A key difference between the two Acts is that under the 1978 legislation a very limited number of specific powers would have been devolved to Scotland, whereas under the 1998 legislation it is the powers reserved to Westminster which are specifically limited; everything not mentioned in the 1998 Act is automatically the responsibility of the Scottish Parliament.

See also
Scottish Constitutional Convention
1979 United Kingdom general election

References

External links
Chapter 1, Events Prior to 1 May 1997, The 1979 Referendum, The Holyrood Inquiry

Scottish devolution
Acts of the Parliament of the United Kingdom concerning Scotland
1978 in Scotland
History of the Labour Party (UK)
United Kingdom Acts of Parliament 1978
Repealed Scottish legislation
Referendums in Scotland